Joseph M. Barr (May 28, 1906 – August 26, 1982) was an American politician who held a variety of positions, including an eleven-year tenure as mayor of Pittsburgh from 1959 to 1970.

Life
Barr was born in Pittsburgh to James P. and Blanche E. Moran Barr. He married Alice White, when she was 29 and he was 43. White had been active with women's Republican groups in Chicago but left the Republican party in support of her Democrat husband. Together they had two children, Alice ("Candy") and Joseph ("Skipp).

Pittsburgh politics
In 1959 Barr the consummate Harrisburg insider and Lawrence the seasoned Pittsburgh chief swapped roles, with Barr coming "home" and running for Mayor and Lawrence becoming Governor of Pennsylvania. He was instrumental as mayor in completing many of the Lawrence programs, while at the same time having the city's infrastructure catch up to all the progress that Lawrence instituted.  Expanded and modernized street lights, water services and the stadiums were all hallmarks of Barr's leadership.  He oversaw the completion of both Three Rivers Stadium and the Pittsburgh Civic Arena, both having bogged down in heated political disputes during Lawrence's tenure.

State Democratic politics
In 1940, Barr became the state's youngest state senator, serving the Pittsburgh-area  in Harrisburg. Barr was elected chair of the State Democratic Party in 1954, and was elected Pennsylvania's male representative on the Democratic National Committee following Lawrence's death in 1966. He retired from public life in 1972.

Other work
In in 1967 and 1968, Barr served as president of the United States Conference of Mayors.

Later life
Barr died on August 26, 1982.  He is buried in Pittsburgh's St. Mary Cemetery.

References

1906 births
1982 deaths
Pennsylvania Democratic Party chairs
Democratic Party Pennsylvania state senators
Mayors of Pittsburgh
20th-century American politicians
Presidents of the United States Conference of Mayors